Cebu City's at-large congressional district was the city-wide electoral district in Cebu City, Philippines. It  elected representatives at-large to the Batasang Pambansa from 1984 to 1986 and earlier to the National Assembly from 1943 to 1944.

The district was first formed ahead of the 1943 Philippine legislative election following the ratification of the Second Philippine Republic constitution which called for a unicameral legislature composed of delegates from all provinces and chartered cities in the country. Cebu, a chartered city since 1937, elected Paulino Gullas to the National Assembly, who was joined by then-mayor Juan C. Zamora as an appointed second delegate. The district became inactive following the restoration of the House of Representatives in 1945 when the city reverted to its old provincial constituency of Cebu's 2nd congressional district. In the unicameral Batasang Pambansa that replaced the House in 1978, Cebu City was included in the multi-member regional electoral district of Region VII (Central Visayas) for its interim parliament. The district was again utilized in the 1984 Philippine parliamentary election when Cebu City was granted two seats in the regular parliament as a highly urbanized city.

After 1986, Cebu City elected its representatives from two single-member congressional districts drawn under a new constitution.

Representation history

See also
Legislative districts of Cebu City

References

Former congressional districts of the Philippines
Politics of Cebu City
1943 establishments in the Philippines
1944 disestablishments in the Philippines
1984 establishments in the Philippines
1986 disestablishments in the Philippines
At-large congressional districts of the Philippines
Congressional districts of Central Visayas
Constituencies established in 1943
Constituencies disestablished in 1944
Constituencies established in 1984
Constituencies disestablished in 1986